Silver economy is the system of production, distribution and consumption of goods and services aimed at using the purchasing potential of older and ageing people and satisfying their consumption, living and health needs. The silver economy is analyzed in the field of social gerontology not as an existing economic system but as an instrument of ageing policy and the political idea of forming a potential, needs-oriented economic system for the aging population. Its main element is gerontechnology as a new scientific, research and implementation paradigm.

History 
The phrase "silver economy" is sometimes used interchangeably with the term "silver market" (the “ageing marketplace” or the “mature market”), which is a narrower concept. The wording "silver market" was created in the 1970s in Japan in the context of increasing of the availability of facilities for seniors. Silver market includes, among others, good, values and services for affluent older people; special solutions in trade between operators, allowing adjustments to aging workforce; ideas of universal design and transgenerational design that aim is to adapt goods and services to people of different ages ("age-friendly"), physical condition and cognitive abilities, which may result in improved social integration.

The silver economy is not a single sector, but rather a collection of products and services from many existing economic sectors, including information technology, telecommunications, financial sector, housing, transport, energy, tourism, culture, infrastructure and local services, and long-term care.

References 

Economies
Old age
Gerontology